Peter Lang (born 24 May 1958) is a German former swimmer. He competed at the 1976 Summer Olympics and the 1984 Summer Olympics.

References

External links
 

1958 births
Living people
German male swimmers
Olympic swimmers of West Germany
Swimmers at the 1976 Summer Olympics
Swimmers at the 1984 Summer Olympics
Universiade medalists in swimming
Sportspeople from Ludwigshafen
Universiade silver medalists for West Germany
Medalists at the 1981 Summer Universiade